Graphis scripta is a crustose lichen in the family Graphidaceae. It is commonly called script lichen, secret writing lichen,  or similar names, because its growth pattern makes it looks like writing. Stigmidium microspilum and Arthonia graphidicola are associated lichenicolous fungi. It is variable with either curved or stellate apothecia. The margins are carbonaceous and raised, without furrows. Mature spores are without color, but become brown with age.

References

scripta
Lichen species
Lichens described in 1753
Lichens of Asia
Lichens of Europe
Lichens of North America
Taxa named by Carl Linnaeus